Anodonthyla pollicaris is a species of microhylid frog. This frog is endemic to Madagascar.

References

Anodonthyla
Endemic frogs of Madagascar
Amphibians described in 1913